As World War II was drawing to a close, the 1945 Brooklyn Dodgers finished 11 games back in third place in the National League race.

Offseason 
 February 24, 1945: Carden Gillenwater was purchased from the Dodgers by the Boston Braves.
 March 28, 1945: Whit Wyatt was purchased from the Dodgers by the Philadelphia Phillies.

Regular season 
Eddie Stanky led the NL in runs scored with 128 in 1945, when he drew a then-record 148 walks.

Season standings

Record vs. opponents

Opening Day lineup

Notable transactions 
 June 15, 1945: Ben Chapman was traded by the Dodgers to the Philadelphia Phillies for Johnny Peacock.

Roster

Player stats

Batting

Starters by position 
Note: Pos = Position; G = Games played; AB = At bats; H = Hits; Avg. = Batting average; HR = Home runs; RBI = Runs batted in

Other batters 
Note: G = Games played; AB = At bats; H = Hits; Avg. = Batting average; HR = Home runs; RBI = Runs batted in

Pitching

Starting pitchers 
Note: G = Games pitched; IP = Innings pitched; W = Wins; L = Losses; ERA = Earned run average; SO = Strikeouts

Other pitchers 
Note: G = Games pitched; IP = Innings pitched; W = Wins; L = Losses; ERA = Earned run average; SO = Strikeouts

Relief pitchers 
Note: G = Games pitched; W = Wins; L = Losses; SV = Saves; ERA = Earned run average; SO = Strikeouts

Awards and honors 

1945 Major League Baseball All-Star Game – Unofficial rosters, the game was not played due to the war
Hal Gregg starter
Goody Rosen reserve
Dixie Walker reserve
TSN Major League All-Star Team
Goody Rosen

Farm system 

LEAGUE CHAMPIONS: Mobile, Zanesville

Notes

References 
Baseball-Reference season page
Baseball Almanac season page

External links 
1945 Brooklyn Dodgers uniform
Brooklyn Dodgers reference site
Acme Dodgers page 
Retrosheet

Los Angeles Dodgers seasons
Brooklyn Dodgers season
1945 in sports in New York City
1940s in Brooklyn
Flatbush, Brooklyn